Cushman School District was a school district headquartered in Cushman, Arkansas.

At its end it operated Cushman Preschool, Cushman Elementary School (K-6), and Cushman High School (7-12).

Previously it operated these levels:
 Cushman Preschool
 Cushman Elementary School
 Cushman Middle School
 Cushman Jr. High School
 Cushman High School

Cushman School District consolidated into Batesville School District on July 1, 2009.

References

Further reading
These include maps of the district:
 (Download)

External links
 
 
 
 

Defunct school districts in Arkansas
School districts disestablished in 2009
2009 disestablishments in Arkansas
Education in Independence County, Arkansas